Cherukavu is a census town in Malappuram district in the state of Kerala, India.

Transportation
Some parts of Cherukavu panchayath lie on the National Highway 966 between Ramanattukara and Kondotty.  Most parts of Pulikkal town comes under Cherukavu panchayath.  Other important towns of Cherukavu panchayath are Peringave and Kannamvettikkavu.  Buses ply from Ramanattukara town to K.V.Kavu regularly and they stop in Peringave on the way for five minutes. The road to Peringave starts from Kaithakkundu on the National Highway 966 and passes through Poochal village.

Pulikkal town
The biggest town in Cherukavu Panchayath area is Pulikkal.  There is another Panchayath called 'Pulikkal' in the neighborhood.  These two place names are used ambiguously by the locals.  The word 'Pulikkal' refers to the bus stop and town.  The word 'Cherukavu' is used by the bureaucracy.

Proposed Karipur-Kondotty Municipality 
The proposed Karipur-Kondotty Municipality comprises:
Kondotty panchayat (villages of Kondotty, and part of Karipur)
Nediyiruppu panchayat (villages of Nediyiruppu, and part of Karipur)
Pallikkal panchayat (villages of Pallikkal, and part of Karipur)
Pulikkal panchayat
Cherukavu panchayat
Vazhayur panchayat

Total Area: 122.99 km2

Total Population (1991 Census): 152,839

Peringave Town

Peringave is a small town in Malappuram district, Kerala, India. It is 22 km away from Calicut. The nearest city is Ramanattukara and is less than an hour away from Calicut International Airport.
Ramapuram Lakshmi Narayana kshethram is one of the main temples in  peringave. There are two masjid in peringave ( Salafi Masjid, Peringave and Juma masjid, Peringave ) . Bus and taxi is the way to reach peringave. Bus facilities are available from calicut and ramanattukara. Kottu padam, vazhayur Pengad etc. are the neighbouring villages.

Kannamvettikkavu 
Kannam-Vetti-Kavu''' is a small town in Cherukavu Panchayath.  It is 4.7 km from Peringave'' town. The town is famous for the ancient Puliyakkad Mahadeva Temple and the new Cherappadam Temple.  The old Juma Masjidh at Cholakkode is set in a scenic paddy field surroundings with a Tribal Colony around it.

Villages and Sububrbs
 E.K.Valavu, Gulf Road and Ramapuram
 Kodappuram, Karimbanakkuzhi and Puliyyakkad
 Poochaal,
Kuriyedam 
Ottupara

Important Landmarks
 Vennayur AUPB School, Ayikkarappadi
 RHSS Ramanattukara 
 Ayikkarappadi Badar Juma masjid
 Ayikkarappadi Salafi Masjid
 Manshaul Uloom Madrassah, Poochal
 Lakshmi Narayana Temle, Peringavu
 Salafi Masjidh, Perngavu Junction
 Mahadeva Temple, Puliyakkad
 Abdullakutty Library
 K.V.Kavu School
 Busthanool Uloom Madrassah
 Mahavishnu Temple, Poochal
 pengad juma masjid

Demographics
 India census, Cherukavu had a population of 25767 with 12851 males and 12916 females.

Transportation
Cherukavu village connects to other parts of India through Feroke town on the west and Nilambur town on the east.  National highway No.66 passes through Pulikkal and the northern stretch connects to Goa and Mumbai.  The southern stretch connects to Cochin and Trivandrum.  State Highway No.28 starts from Nilambur and connects to Ooty, Mysore and Bangalore through Highways.12,29 and 181. The nearest airport is at Kozhikode.  The nearest major railway station is at Feroke.

See also 
 Aikkarappadi

References

Cities and towns in Malappuram district
Kondotty area